The AEG G.V was a biplane bomber aircraft of World War I, a further refinement of the AEG G.IV. The type saw limited production before the Armistice, and never entered operational service. It featured a 600 kg (1,320 lb) bombload.

After the war, several were converted into 6-passenger airliners. It was the only large German World War I aircraft to see commercial duties in any significant capacity. Initially, passengers sat in an open cockpit, but a Limousine version was soon developed. AEG attached a cabin fairing to enclose the passenger area and outfitted the nose with a hinged door for baggage. Finally, a toilet was provided aft of the passenger cabin.

Operators

Luftstreitkrafte

Swedish Air Force

Specifications (AEG G.V)

See also

References

Further reading

 Kroschel, Günter; Stützer, Helmut: Die deutschen Militärflugzeuge 1910-18, Wilhelmshaven 1977
 Munson, Kenneth: Bomber 1914–19, Zürich 1968, Nr. 20
 Nowarra, Heinz: Die Entwicklung der Flugzeuge 1914-18, München 1959
 Sharpe, Michael: Doppeldecker, Dreifachdecker & Wasserflugzeuge, Gondrom, Bindlach 2001, 

G.V
1910s German bomber aircraft
Aircraft first flown in 1918